The Battle of Memel was fought between the Samogitians and the Livonian branch of the Teutonic Knights in 1323. 

According to the chronicle of Peter of Dusburg, the Samogitians burned the city, but failed to take the Memel Castle. They also burned another three neighboring castles probably Žardė (now the southern outskirts of Klaipėda), Poyso (on the left bank of upstream Dangė River, east of Klaipėda), and Eketė (at the confluence of Dangė and Eketė Rivers). 

After the battle, in 1328, the Livonian Order transferred the city and the surrounding area to the Prussian branch of the Teutonic Knights. In 1392, the Bishop of Courland also transferred his holding in Memel to the Teutonic Knights.

References

Memel (1323)
Memel (1323)
Conflicts in 1323
1323 in Europe
History of Klaipėda
History of Samogitia